Joseph Tjitunga (born 21 July 1971) is a Namibian marathon runner. Tjitunga competed for Namibia at the 1996 Summer Olympics in the men's marathon, where he finished 76th of 124 competitors. As of 2006, Tjitunga held the third fastest time for a Namibian runner in the marathon . Tjitunga also competed at the 1995 and 1997 World Championships in Athletics.

References

External links
 

1971 births
Living people
Namibian male marathon runners
Athletes (track and field) at the 1996 Summer Olympics
Olympic athletes of Namibia
Athletes (track and field) at the 1998 Commonwealth Games
Commonwealth Games competitors for Namibia
World Athletics Championships athletes for Namibia
Namibian male long-distance runners
Namibian male cross country runners
20th-century Namibian people
21st-century Namibian people